Ivan Aleksandrovich Bogdanov (6 November 1897 – 22 July 1942) was a Soviet lieutenant-general and army commander. 

He fought in World War I in the Imperial Russian Army before going over to the Bolsheviks. 

In World War II, he commanded the Reserve Front, 43rd Army and 39th Army.
He was killed in action on 22 July 1942 at the head of the 39th Army, which was surrounded during Operation Seydlitz.
He was seriously wounded in the area of the village of Krapivni Kalininsky region, when he organized and led an attempted breakout. He was rushed to the hospital in Kalinin, but died of his wounds in the hospital on the evening of July 22. He was buried in Kalinin in a mass grave in Lenin Square.  

He was a recipient of the Order of Lenin, the Order of the Red Banner and the Order of the Red Star.

Honours and awards

Bibliography
 

1897 births
1942 deaths
Russian military personnel of World War I
Soviet military personnel of the Russian Civil War
Soviet military personnel killed in World War II
Recipients of the Order of Lenin
Recipients of the Order of the Red Banner

Soviet lieutenant generals
Frunze Military Academy alumni